EMC may refer to:

Arts and media 
 eMC (hip hop group)
 EMC Publishing, LLC, an American publishing company
 Essential Media Communications, an Australian PR and polling company
 European Music Council, a cultural organization
 "E.M.C.", a song by Hawkwind from their 1988 album The Xenon Codex

Science and medicine 
 Emergency Medical Care, a Canadian ambulance service
 Endoplasmic reticulum membrane protein complex
 Environmental Modeling Center, one  of the United States National Centers for Environmental Prediction
 Equilibrium moisture content
 European Medical Command
 European Muon Collaboration, a defunct physics collaboration
 EMC effect in deep inelastic scattering
 Extramacrochaetae, a D. melanogaster gene

Technology 
 Dell EMC, an American data management company, formerly called EMC Corporation
 Electromagnetic compatibility
 Energetically modified cement
 Enhanced Machine Controller, now LinuxCNC, software used to control CNC machines

Transport 
 Electro-Motive Corporation, an American rail car manufacturer
 EMC Motorcycles, a defunct British motorcycle manufacturer
 Evergreen Marine Corporation, a Taiwanese shipping company

Other uses
 Early Middle Chinese, the language of the Qieyun rhyme dictionary (601)
 Economic Management Council, an Irish cabinet subcommittee
 Electric membership corporation, a type of utility cooperative
 Encyclopedia of the Medieval Chronicle, a reference work
 Entrepreneurial Management Center, now the Lavin Entrepreneurship Center at San Diego State University
 Erode Municipal Corporation, in Tamil Nadu, India
 Evangelical Mennonite Conference, a Canadian Christian denomination
 Evangelical Methodist Church, an American Christian denomination

See also 

 EMC2 (disambiguation)